The International Shoe Company Building is a historic factory building located at 665 Missouri Avenue in West Plains, Howell County, Missouri.  The one-story building consists of two wings, one constructed in 1946 and another in 1952.  The 1946 wing contains 41,400 square feet; and the 1952 wing contains 20,736 square feet. The building was erected as a factory for the International Shoe Company. The factory closed in 1993.

It was listed on the National Register of Historic Places in 2011.

References

External links

Industrial buildings and structures on the National Register of Historic Places in Missouri
Industrial buildings completed in 1946
Buildings and structures in Howell County, Missouri
National Register of Historic Places in Howell County, Missouri
1946 establishments in Missouri
Shoe factories